Spade House was the home of the science fiction writer H. G. Wells from 1901 to 1909. It is a large mansion overlooking Sandgate, near Folkestone, in southeast England.

History

The house was designed by C.F.A. Voysey, and extended in 1903. Voysey included a signature heart shape on the door of every home he designed, but Wells rejected this in favour of a spade. Wells's two sons were born here, and while living at Spade House Wells wrote books including Kipps, Tono-Bungay and Ann Veronica.

The house has been Grade II* listed on the National Heritage List for England since March 1975. It is now occupied by the "Wells House" nursing home. At the entrance is an ornate nameplate and a blue plaque from the Sandgate Society, commemorating the link to Wells.

References

External links

 
 Complete H. G. Wells texts at Gutenberg
 

Arts and Crafts architecture in England
Buildings by C.F.A. Voysey
Country houses in Kent
Grade II* listed houses
Grade II* listed buildings in Kent
H. G. Wells
Houses completed in 1903
Folkestone and Hythe District